Boulenger's least gecko (Sphaerodactylus scapularis) is a species of lizard in the family Sphaerodactylidae. It is found in Ecuador and Colombia.

References

Sphaerodactylus
Reptiles of Colombia
Reptiles of Ecuador
Reptiles described in 1902
Taxa named by George Albert Boulenger